Cercul Atletic București was a team from Bucharest, Romania. They played in the Romanian league before World War I.

They were made of players from the Athletic Academy of Bucharest. They also represented Romania in the Summer Olympic Games in those times. They were not football professionals, but they played two seasons in Romanian Football Championship.

Performances
 Second Place: 1912–13
 Third Place: 1913–14

Bibliography
 Romeo Ionescu: Enciclopedia fotbalului românesc Vol. I. Ploiești 2000, .

External links
 Saison 1912/13 auf romaniansoccer.ro (English)
 Saison 1913/14 auf romaniansoccer.ro (English)

Football in Romania
1912 establishments in Romania